Rehra Bazar is a block located in Balrampur district in rural Uttar Pradesh. It is one of the nine blocks of Balrampur district. According to the administration records, the block code of Rehra Bazar is 564. The block has 96 villages and there are total 32,318 houses in this block. Pincode of Rehra baza is 271306.There are 81 gram panchayats and 96 villages in Rehra Bazar kshetra panchayat / block. Hindi and Urdu are spoken by the natives here.

Demographics 
The total geographical area in which this village is expanded in  (2.88 km2). Rehra Bazar's population is 217,742. Out of this, 111,391 are males while the females count 106,351 here. This block has 37,451 children in the age bracket of 0–6 years. Among them 19,374 are boys and 18,077 are girls. The latitude 27.182732 and 82.28908 longitude are the geocoordinate of the Rehra Bazar. Utraula, Balrampur, Tulsipur, and Faizabad are the nearby cities to Rehra bazar.

Education 

The literacy ratio in Rehra Bazar block is 46%. 101,849 out of a total 217,742 population is literate here. Among males, the literacy ratio is 55% as 61,954 males out of total 111,391 are literate while female literacy rate is 37% as 39,895 out of total 106,351 females are literate in this block.

The negative portion is that the illiteracy ratio of Rehra Bazar block is shockingly high – 53%. Here 115,893 out of total 217,742 people are illiterate. Male illiteracy rate here is 44% as 49,437 males out of total 111,391 are uneducated. In females, the illiteracy ratio is 62% and 66,456 out of total 106,351 females are illiterate in this block.

Educational Institutes in Rehra Bazar Block

Transportation 
Rehra Bazar is 177 km from State capital Lucknow, Deoria Mainaha (1 km), Garib Nagar (1 km), Majhowa Kurthua (2 km), Jogiveer (2 km), and Sahpur Itai (2 km) are the nearby villages.

 Balrampur - 28 km
 Tulsipur - 28 km
 Gainsari Jn - 33 km
 Lakhpat Nagar - 36 km

Airport:

 Gorakhpur Airport - 135 km
 Amausi Airport - 179 km
 Varanasi Airport - 236 km
 Bamrauli Airport - 242 km

References 

Balrampur district, Uttar Pradesh